Victor Cuica (Caracas, Venezuela, 19 April 1949 – 26 December 2020 ) was a Venezuelan musician and actor recognized for innovation in the fusion of the Jazz with Afro-Caribbean music. He participated in Venezuelan cinema, between the 70s and 80s, with the character of Alexis in Se solicita muchacha de buena presencia y motorizado con moto propia along with the actor, screenwriter and writer Fausto Verdial.

References

Venezuelan musicians
Venezuelan actors
1949 births
2020 deaths
Death in Caracas